Joseph Fortunato (July 4, 1918 – February 21, 2004) was an American football, basketball, and baseball coach and college athletics administrator. He served as the head football coach at Adrian College from 1953 to 1955, tallying a mark of 8–17–1. Fortunato was also head baseball coach at the University of Toledo from 1952 to 1953 and at Adrian in 1954, compiling a career college baseball record of 11–26. In addition, he served as the head basketball coach at Upper Iowa University and at the University of Dubuque. He died in 2004.

Early life and education
A native of Youngstown, Ohio, Fortunato earned a bachelor of science degree at Kent State University.

Coaching career
Fortunato served in the United States Navy as an athletic officer in the V-5 program at Miami University, where he coached the linemen on the football team under Sid Gillman. From 1946 to 1947, Fortunato coached football and basketball at Leetonia High School in Leetonia, Ohio before moving to Upper Iowa University, where he served as athletic director, head basketball coach, and assistant football coach. He was hired at the University of Dubuque in April 1949 as head basketball coach and football line coach. In April 1951, Fortunato was named line coach at the University of Toledo, joining the football coaching staff headed by Don Greenwood.

Fortunato was the head football coach at Adrian College in Adrian, Michigan. He held that position for three seasons, from 1953 until 1955. His coaching record at Adrian was 8–17–1.

Head coaching record

College football

References

External links
 

1918 births
2004 deaths
Adrian Bulldogs athletic directors
Adrian Bulldogs baseball coaches
Adrian Bulldogs football coaches
Adrian Bulldogs men's basketball coaches
Basketball coaches from Ohio
Dubuque Spartans football coaches
Dubuque Spartans men's basketball coaches
Miami RedHawks football coaches
Toledo Rockets baseball coaches
Toledo Rockets football coaches
Upper Iowa Peacocks athletic directors
Upper Iowa Peacocks football coaches
Upper Iowa Peacocks men's basketball coaches
High school basketball coaches in Ohio
High school football coaches in Ohio
Kent State University alumni
Sportspeople from Youngstown, Ohio
United States Navy personnel of World War II
United States Navy officers